Four Paws (stylized FOUR PAWS) is a global animal welfare organisation based in Vienna, Austria. The organisation is focusing on gradually improving the living conditions of animals under direct human influence, by revealing suffering, rescuing animals in need and protecting them.

History 

Four Paws was founded on 4 March 1988 by Helmut Dungler to protect animals from being farmed for their fur. In 1989, the first charges were brought against a number of fur farms in Austria. Furthermore, the airlines AUA and Lauda Air stopped the transport of captured exotic birds.

In 1991 Four Paws demanded the mandatory labelling of eggs and a total ban on battery cages for egg-laying hens. In 1998, Four Paws opened the first sanctuary for bears in Arbesbach. In 1999 the foundation brought about the closure of Austria‘s largest battery cage egg producer.

In 2000, Dancing Bears Park Belitsa opened in Bulgaria, and the first three former-dancing bears moved in. In 2002, animal welfare entered Germany‘s Basic Law and Federal Minister Renate Künast thanked Four Paws by name. In 2005, the Federal Animal Welfare Act came into force in Austria and banned both fur farming and the use of wild animals in circuses. In 2008, the Big Cat Sanctuary Lionsrock opened in South Africa. Helmut Dungler was awarded the Silver Order of Merit for Services Rendered to the Republic of Austria.

In 2010, Four Paws started a cooperation with the Princess Alia Foundation. In 2011, 50.000 signatures against the puppy trade were handed over to the European Commission in Brussels. At the same time, the international protest of Four Paws against a planned law to cull dogs was successful. The law was thrown out by the Romanian Supreme Court. In 2012, an EU-wide ban on conventional battery cages for hens came into force.

In 2014, the Bear Sanctuary Prishtina was opened. In 2015, Four Paws initiated a campaign against Canned Lion Hunting which attracted 281,000 supporters. Furthermore, upon pressure from Four Paws and other animal rights organisations, Austrian organic farms stopped killing of male fledglings. Furthermore, Four Paws launched a campaign focusing on the US company eBay due to illegal pet traders. Over 200.000 supporters have signed this petition which called on eBay to introduce seller verification on all of its classified sites. In 2018, the organisation rescued lions and bears from "Europe's worst zoo" in Tirana, Albania. In the same year, the 1st International Animal Welfare Summit was organised by Four Paws in Vienna, Austria, with famous guests, like Chinese artist Ai Weiwei.

On 17 January 2018, Switzerland took a step against anonymous pet trafficking on the Internet. From 1 March 2018, online traders have had to provide their full name and address, as well as the country of origin and breeding of the dogs offered for sale. On 5 January 2020 founder and president, Heli Dungler, died unexpectedly. In January 2020, Four Paws rescued sick lions at a zoo in Khartoum after worldwide outrage following concerning reports of the animals' condition.

On 4 September 2020, the organisation with the veterinarians Amir Khalil and Frank Goeritz from the Leibniz Institute for Zoo and Wildlife Research (IZW) examined and approved "the world's loneliest elephant" Kaavan for travel to an elephant sanctuary. The relocation to the Cambodia Wildlife Sanctuary at the end of November 2020 was supported by singer Cher's NGO Free The Wild and by businessman Eric Margolis.

In January 2021, Four Paws published the Austrian edition of the Meat Atlas in cooperation with the Heinrich Böll Foundation and the environmental protection organization Global 2000.

In March 2022, four tigers were rescued from Argentina to find a new home in South Africa. It was the organization's first rescue in South America.

Controversy 

Claims by Four Paws in The Independent on 16 April 2020 stated there had been a surge in dog and cat meat eating in Vietnam as a result of fake news suggesting it would cure COVID-19. Four Paws' head of stray animal care in Asia, Katherine Polak, was quoted saying she strongly suspected doctors were now recommending cat and dog meat to treat COVID-19. However, on 24 April 2020, fact checking non profit PolitiFact rated the claim as false. Politico, White House reporter Tina Nguyen called it mind boggling and a nasty racist attack. In May 2020, Four Paws responded with an official statement defending their claims.

Objectives 

The organisation is positioned as "a strong, global, and independent voice for animals under direct human control" by offering sustainable solutions for animals in need, changing consumer behaviour, driving legal change and building partnerships. The purpose of Four Paws is to inform the general public about animal rights and to bring pets and wild animals in captivity. The organisation also supports a ban on farming animals for fur in Europe, strict limitations on keeping wild animals in private captivity and a ban on wild animals in circuses.

Topics 
Four Paws measures include the following topics.

 Bears: Four Paws rescues bears forced to live in poor conditions in circuses, zoos or in private hands. The organisation has projects in Vietnam, Austria, Bulgaria, Poland, Ukraine, and Kosovo.

 Big Cats: Four Paws establishes sanctuaries and projects for big cats in South Africa, Jordan, Iraq, Gaza, Netherlands or in Bohemia. The organisation also cooperates with partners like the National Council of Societies for the Prevention of Cruelty to Animals (NSPCA).
 Stray Animals: Four Paws establishes solutions to prevent outbreaks of disease and uncontrolled levels of reproduction among strays in regions like in Myanmar, Romania, Ukraine and Cambodia In addition, the organization is working to sustainably end the dog and cat meat trade. 
 Horses: The organisation protects Europe's last populations of horses living in the wild Danube Delta in Romania and in the ancient city of Petra.
 Orangutans: Four Paws looks after orphaned orangutans and prepares them to live independently in the wild. Furthermore, the organisation funded a forest school in Indonesia's East Kalimantan.
 Fur Farming: Four Paws supports a ban on keeping animals for fur, a legal obligation to label all fur products and, in the long term, a Europe-wide ban on importing and retailing all furs and fur products. In August 2018, Four Paws has joined the Fur Free Alliance (FFA) to launch a new campaign urging fashion brand Prada to adopt a fur-free policy like Gucci, Versace, Armani, Donna Karan and Hugo Boss. In February 2021, the organization published a statement on the assessment conducted by the Food and Agriculture Organisation of the United Nations (FAO), the World Organisation for Animal Health (OIE) and the World Health Organisation (WHO) on SARS-CoV-2 in animals used for fur farming shows high risks for public health.
 Assistance for animals in distress: The organisation rescues animals after natural disasters and helps local people whose livelihood depends upon the animals.
 European Union: The organisation urges the European Parliament to call for stricter EU regulation on the trade in live wild animals, a clear commitment to step up efforts to combat the illegal wildlife trade as well as EU and Member States' financial support to wildlife rescue centres and sanctuaries. Moreover, the organization criticizes the EU-Council's decision on the signing of the Mercosur agreement between the EU and the United States concerning high quality beef.

See also 
 List of bear sanctuaries
 List of animal sanctuaries

References

External links 
 
 VIER PFOTEN, Austrian headquarter website

Animal welfare organizations based in Europe
Anti-vivisection organizations
Food politics
Organizations established in 1988